Ajmer District is a district of the state of Rajasthan in North western India. The city of Ajmer is the district headquarters.

Ajmer District has an area of 8,481 km2, and a population of 2,583,052 (2011 census). There are 1,869,044 Hindus, 244,341 Muslims and 47,812 Jains. The district is situated in the center of Rajasthan, and is bounded by Nagaur district to the north, Jaipur and Tonk districts to the east, Bhilwara district to the south, and Pali district to the west. Ajmer district is bordered by the districts of Jaipur, Tonk, Nagaur, Bhilwara, Pali, and Rajsamand.

Ajmer district is a beautiful district situated in the western state of Rajasthan, India. This district is located in the central region of Rajasthan and covers an area of approximately 8,481 square kilometers. The district is known for its rich cultural heritage, historical significance, and natural beauty. The city of Ajmer is the headquarters of the district. The district is located in the Aravalli mountain range and is home to many hills and valleys. The region is known for its dry climate and extreme temperatures, with hot summers and cold winters. The district is also home to several rivers and lakes, including the Ana Sagar Lake and the Foy Sagar Lake.

The district has a rich history that dates back to the 7th century AD. It was ruled by various dynasties, including the Chauhans, Mughals, and British. The region was an important center of trade and commerce, with Ajmer being a major stop on the trade route between Delhi and Mumbai. The district is also known for its religious significance, with the city of Ajmer being an important pilgrimage site for both Hindus and Muslims.

The city of Ajmer is home to the famous Ajmer Sharif Dargah, which is the tomb of the Sufi saint, Khwaja Moinuddin Chishti. The dargah is one of the most visited religious sites in India, with millions of devotees visiting it every year. The dargah is known for its beautiful architecture, intricate carvings, and peaceful atmosphere.

Apart from the Ajmer Sharif Dargah, the district is also home to many other religious sites, including the Ana Sagar Lake, which is surrounded by several temples, including the Durga Temple and the Nasiyan Jain Temple. The district is also home to several forts and palaces, including the Ajmer Fort and the Taragarh Fort, which offer a glimpse into the rich history and culture of the region.

The district is also known for its handicrafts, including the famous Ajmeri Pagdi (turban), which is made of high-quality cloth and is worn by many men in Rajasthan. The district is also known for its textiles, jewelry, and leather goods, which are made by skilled artisans.

The economy of the district is largely dependent on agriculture, with crops like wheat, barley, and mustard being grown in large quantities. The district is also known for its marble industry, with the famous Makrana marble being extracted from the quarries in the region. The district is also home to several small and medium-scale industries, including textiles, handicrafts, and food processing.

The district has a rich cultural heritage, with the people of the region being known for their love of music, dance, and literature. The region has produced many famous poets, musicians, and artists, including the famous Sufi poet, Amir Khusrau. The district is also known for its colorful festivals, including the Urs of Khwaja Moinuddin Chishti, which is celebrated with great fervor every year.

In conclusion, Ajmer district is a beautiful region with a rich history, culture, and natural beauty. The district is known for its religious significance, handicrafts, and agriculture. The district offers a unique blend of tradition and modernity, with its rich cultural heritage coexisting with the rapidly changing world. The district is a must-visit for anyone interested in history, culture, and natural beauty.

History 
Ajmer has a rich history of Hindu kingdoms, which ruled over the region for centuries. Let's take a look at some of the most prominent Hindu kingdoms that shaped the history of Ajmer:

 Chauhan Dynasty: The Chauhan dynasty is one of the most famous Hindu dynasties that ruled over Ajmer. They established the city of Ajmer in the 7th century CE, and the city remained their capital until the 12th century. The most famous Chauhan king was Prithviraj Chauhan, who ruled from 1166 to 1192 CE. He was a great warrior and is known for his battles against the invading Muslim armies of Muhammad Ghori.
 Solanki Dynasty: The Solanki dynasty was another powerful Hindu dynasty that ruled over Ajmer and the surrounding regions. They ruled from the 10th to the 13th century CE and were known for their architectural prowess. The famous Taragarh Fort in Ajmer was built by the Solankis.
 Tomar Dynasty: The Tomar dynasty ruled over Ajmer in the 14th and 15th centuries CE. They were known for their patronage of the arts and literature. The famous Sanskrit poet Chand Bardai, who wrote the epic poem Prithviraj Raso, was a court poet of the Tomar dynasty.
 Mewar Kingdom: The Mewar kingdom, also known as the Udaipur kingdom, was a prominent Hindu kingdom that ruled over Ajmer and the surrounding regions from the 16th to the 20th century CE. The famous Rajput king Maharana Pratap, who fought against the Mughal emperor Akbar, was a member of the Mewar dynasty.

The Hindu kingdoms that ruled over Ajmer played a significant role in shaping the culture and history of the region. They were known for their bravery, art, literature, and architecture, and their legacy continues to inspire the people of Ajmer even today.

General History 
The hills are some of the oldest in India, geologically. Microliths from early hominids have been found in the district. It is believed that cultures in this region had contact with the Indus Valley civilization. Pottery shards from Painted Gray Ware culture, Black and Red Ware and Northern Black Polished Ware cultures have been found with Chosla and Sameliya. Some pre-Ashokan Brahmi inscriptions have been found in Bhilot Mata Temple in Badli.

Pushkar was ruled for many years by the Kushans, Sakas etc until the rise of the Chauhans. In 1192 the last independent Chauhan ruler Prithviraj Chauhan was defeated by Mohammad Ghori, and the district became part of the Delhi Sultanate. In 1287, Hammir Dev Chauhan regained Ajmer, before it was reconquered by Delhi in 1301. In the last period of the Delhi Sultanate, Ajmer was ruled by Mallu Khan. During Mughal rule the district was part of Ajmer Subah. After 1712, the district returned to Rathore hands under the suzerainty of the Marathas. In 1801, the British took over Ajmer and converted it to a district. It became part of Rajasthan after 1950.

Geography 
The eastern portion of the district is generally flat, broken only by gentle undulations. The western parts, from north-west to south-west, are intersected by the Aravalli Range. Many of the valleys in this region are sandy deserts, part of India's Thar Desert, with an occasional oasis of cultivation. Some fertile tracts are also present; among these is the plain on which lies the town of Ajmer. This valley has an artificial lake, and is protected by the massive walls of the Nagpathar range or Serpent rock, which forms a barrier against the sand. The only hills in the district are the Aravalli Range and its offshoots. Ajmer is almost totally devoid of rivers. The Banas River touches the south-eastern boundary of the district so as to irrigate the pargana of Samur. Four small streams—the Sagarmati, Saraswati, Khari and Dai—also intersect the district.

Division
The district is divided into four subdivisions, Ajmer, Beawar, Kekri and Kishangarh, and further subdivided into sixteen tehsils, Ajmer, Arai, Beawar, Bhinai, Pushkar, Sarwar, Pisangan, Tantoti, Nasirabad, Masuda, Kekri, Kishangarh, Roopangarh, Bijainagar, Tatgarh, Sanver

Ajmer district is divided into seven administrative divisions, each headed by a Sub-Divisional Magistrate (SDM). These divisions are further divided into tehsils and panchayats for efficient governance and development. Let's take a look at each of these divisions in detail:

 Ajmer North: This division is located in the northern part of Ajmer district and covers an area of 1266 square kilometers. It comprises two tehsils, namely Kishangarh and Naseerabad. The division is home to several important religious sites, including the Ajmer Sharif Dargah, the Foy Sagar Lake, and the Nasiyan Jain Temple.
 Ajmer South: This division covers an area of 2005 square kilometers and is located in the southern part of Ajmer district. It comprises three tehsils, namely Ajmer, Beawar, and Masuda. The division is known for its rich history and culture and is home to several important forts and palaces, including the Taragarh Fort and the Ajmer Fort.
 Kekri: This division is located in the eastern part of Ajmer district and covers an area of 1047 square kilometers. It comprises two tehsils, namely Kekri and Pisangan. The division is known for its agriculture, with crops like wheat, mustard, and bajra being grown in large quantities.
 Kishangarh: This division covers an area of 808 square kilometers and is located in the north-eastern part of Ajmer district. It comprises two tehsils, namely Kishangarh and Roopangarh. The division is known for its marble industry, with the famous Makrana marble being extracted from the quarries in the region.
 Masuda: This division is located in the south-western part of Ajmer district and covers an area of 1366 square kilometers. It comprises two tehsils, namely Masuda and Bhinai. The division is known for its agriculture, with crops like wheat, mustard, and gram being grown in large quantities.
 Naseerabad: This division is located in the north-western part of Ajmer district and covers an area of 812 square kilometers. It comprises two tehsils, namely Naseerabad and Sarwar. The division is known for its handicrafts, including the famous Ajmeri Pagdi (turban), which is made of high-quality cloth and is worn by many men in Rajasthan.
 Beawar: This division covers an area of 1177 square kilometers and is located in the central part of Ajmer district. It comprises two tehsils, namely Beawar and Jawaja. The division is known for its textile industry, with fabrics like bandhani and leheriya being produced in large quantities.

In conclusion, the seven divisions of Ajmer district are diverse in terms of their geography, culture, and economy. Each division has its unique identity and contributes to the overall growth and development of the district. The administrative divisions ensure effective governance and facilitate the implementation of various development programs and initiatives.

Demographics 

According to the 2011 census Ajmer district has a population of 2,583,052. This gives it a ranking of 161st in India (out of a total of 640). Its population growth rate over the decade 2001-2011 was 18.48%. Ajmer has a sex ratio of 950 females for every 1000 males, and a literacy rate of 70.46%. 40.08% of the population lives in urban areas. Scheduled Castes and Scheduled Tribes make up 478,027 (18.51%) and 63,482 (2.46%) of the population respectively.

At the time of the 2011 Census of India, 55.16% of the population spoke Rajasthani, 30.97% Hindi, 10.08% Marwari and 1.85% Sindhi as their first language.

Ajmer district, located in the Indian state of Rajasthan, has a diverse population with people from various castes, religions, and ethnicities. According to the 2011 Census of India, the population of Ajmer district is 2,584,913, with a population density of 281 people per square kilometer. The sex ratio of the district is 951 females per 1000 males, which is lower than the national average of 940 females per 1000 males.

Let's take a closer look at the demographics of Ajmer district:

 Religious Composition: The majority of the population in Ajmer district follows Hinduism, which constitutes 87% of the total population. Islam is the second most widely followed religion, with 11% of the population being Muslim. The district is also home to small communities of Jains, Sikhs, and Christians.
 Caste Composition: The district has a large population of Scheduled Castes (SC) and Scheduled Tribes (ST), who together form 22% of the total population. The most populous SC community in the district is the Meghwal community, followed by the Bhil community, which is the most populous ST community.
 Language: The people of Ajmer district predominantly speak Hindi and Rajasthani. The Rajasthani dialects spoken in the district are Marwari, Dhundhari, and Harauti.
 Literacy: The literacy rate in Ajmer district is 70%, which is lower than the national average of 74%. The male literacy rate is 81%, while the female literacy rate is 58%.
 Rural-Urban Divide: The district has a significant rural population, with 70% of the total population residing in rural areas. The remaining 30% live in urban areas, with the city of Ajmer being the largest urban center in the district.
 Age Structure: The district has a relatively young population, with 34% of the population being below the age of 15 years. The 15-64 age group constitutes 60% of the population, while the population above 65 years of age is 6%.
 Migration: The district has a significant migrant population, with people from neighboring states of Uttar Pradesh, Madhya Pradesh, and Bihar coming to Ajmer for work. The district is also home to a large number of people who have migrated from Pakistan after the partition of India in 1947.

In conclusion, Ajmer district has a diverse population with a mix of religions, castes, and languages. The rural-urban divide and migration patterns in the district play a significant role in shaping its demographics. The district's young population presents both opportunities and challenges for its development and growth in the years to come.

Politics of Ajmer District 
Ajmer district is an important political center in the state of Rajasthan, with a rich history of political movements and electoral contests. The district is part of the Ajmer Lok Sabha constituency and is divided into eight assembly constituencies. Let's take a closer look at the politics of Ajmer district:

 Political Parties: The two major political parties in Rajasthan, the Indian National Congress and the Bharatiya Janata Party (BJP), have a strong presence in Ajmer district. Other political parties, such as the Bahujan Samaj Party (BSP), the National People's Party (NPP), and the Aam Aadmi Party (AAP), also have a limited presence in the district.
 Political Movements: Ajmer has a rich history of political movements, particularly in the field of education and social justice. The Bhil Movement, led by the tribal communities of the region, fought for the rights of the marginalized communities in the 1980s and 1990s. The district has also been a center of the struggle for education rights, with several protests and movements demanding better facilities and infrastructure for schools and colleges.
 Electoral Contests: Ajmer district has been a key battleground for electoral contests in Rajasthan. In the 2018 by-election for the Ajmer Lok Sabha seat, the Congress candidate defeated the BJP candidate in a closely contested election. The BJP had won the seat in the 2014 general elections, but the Congress managed to stage a comeback in 2018.
 Local Governance: The district has a three-tier system of local governance, with the Gram Panchayats at the village level, the Panchayat Samitis at the block level, and the Zila Parishad at the district level. The local governance system plays a crucial role in addressing the developmental needs of the district and in providing basic services to the people.

In conclusion, Ajmer district is an important political center in Rajasthan, with a rich history of political movements and electoral contests. The major political parties, the Congress and the BJP, have a strong presence in the district, and the local governance system plays a crucial role in addressing the developmental needs of the region.

Challenges of Ajmer District 
Like many other regions in India, Ajmer district faces several challenges that need to be addressed for the overall development of the district. Let's take a closer look at some of the key challenges faced by Ajmer district:

 Water scarcity: Ajmer district is located in a semi-arid region and is prone to droughts. The district faces acute water scarcity during the summer months, and the groundwater level has been depleting rapidly over the years. The lack of adequate water supply has affected the agricultural productivity of the region and has led to socio-economic challenges.
 Infrastructure: Ajmer district lacks adequate infrastructure, particularly in the areas of roads, public transport, and healthcare facilities. The roads are poorly maintained, and the public transport system is inadequate, making it difficult for the people to access basic services. The healthcare facilities in the district are also inadequate, and there is a shortage of doctors and medical staff.
 Education: While Ajmer district has a rich history of education, there are still many challenges that need to be addressed in this area. The quality of education in the district is poor, particularly in the government-run schools. There is a shortage of teachers, and the infrastructure of the schools is inadequate, affecting the overall learning outcomes of the students.
 Unemployment: Ajmer district has a high rate of unemployment, particularly among the youth. The lack of employment opportunities has led to social and economic challenges in the region, including poverty, migration, and crime.
 Environmental degradation: The rapid urbanization and industrialization in the district have led to environmental degradation, including air and water pollution. This has had adverse effects on the health of the people and the ecosystem of the region.

In conclusion, Ajmer district faces several challenges that need to be addressed for the overall development of the region. The lack of adequate water supply, inadequate infrastructure, poor quality of education, high unemployment rates, and environmental degradation are some of the key challenges that need to be addressed for the sustainable development of the district.

References

 Ajmer The Imperial Gazetteer of India, 1909, v. 5, p. 137-146.

External links

 Ajmer District website
Ajmer on Marwadis.com
eAjmer.co.in

 
Districts in Ajmer division